The year 1924 was marked, in science fiction, by the following events.

Births and deaths

Births 

 June 6 : Robert Abernathy, American writer (died 1990)
 July 20 : Thomas Berger, American writer (died 2014)
 André Caroff, French writer (died 2009)

Deaths

Events

Awards

Literary releases

Novels 
 Berge Meere und Giganten, by Alfred Döblin.
The City of Light, a novel by Mieczysław Smolarski in genres of dystopia and catastrophism. The novel's themes include antimilitarism and pacifism, prevalent after World War I.

Stories collections

Short stories 
  Deux mille ans sous la mer, by  Léon Groc.

Movies 
 Aelita, by Yakov Protazanov.

See also 
 1924 in science
 1923 in science fiction
 1925 in science fiction

References

Science fiction by year

science-fiction